Reno Stead Airport  is a large public and military general aviation airport located in the North Valleys area, 10 nautical miles (19 km) northwest of the central business district of Reno, in Washoe County, Nevada, United States. A former military installation until 1966, when it was known as Stead Air Force Base, the airport's sole remaining military presence consists of an Army Aviation Support Facility and the 189th General Support Aviation Battalion of the Nevada Army National Guard, flying CH-47 Chinook helicopters.  The airport is owned by the Reno Tahoe Airport Authority. The National Plan of Integrated Airport Systems for 2011–2015 categorized it as a general aviation reliever airport.

Although most U.S. airports use the same three-letter location identifier for the FAA and IATA, this airport is assigned RTS by the FAA, but has no designation from the IATA (which assigned RTS to Rottnest Island Airport in Rottnest Island, Western Australia). Reno Stead Airport does not have regularly scheduled service, but functions as a general aviation reliever for the nearby Reno–Tahoe International Airport. The airport is used by the Bureau of Land Management as a base for fire fighting aircraft.

History

The location was opened by the United States Army Air Forces in 1942, in the middle of the war.

Stead Air Force Base was established by the United States Air Force (USAF) at the airfield in 1951, when it was determined that the Sierra Nevada and forests would be suitable for survival training. The USAF Survival School and 3904th Composite Wing moved to the base from Camp Carson, Colorado, on 29 May 1951. Equipped with C-119 Flying Boxcars for training, SAC had begun the training for its personnel, teaching them how to survive if forced down in remote and/or unfriendly terrain, how to escape capture, and how to escape if captured.

Other commands wanted to train aircrews in survival techniques, and in September 1954 Stead AFB became part of the Air Training Command (ATC), and the 3904th Composite Wing became the 3635th Combat Crew Training Wing. After a number of name changes, the survival training school became the 3637th Combat Crew Training Squadron.

In January 1958, a small group of instructor pilots from Randolph AFB, Texas, was sent to Stead AFB to determine the feasibility of advanced helicopter training in the area's mountains. On 15 July 1958, the 3635th Crew Training Wing was redesignated as the 3635th Flying Training Wing (Advanced), concurrent with the relocation of the USAF Helicopter Pilot School to Stead.

In 1960 and 1962, astronauts were trained in desert survival by the 3637th Combat Crew Training Squadron and then helicoptered to a location near the Carson Sink for further training.

In 1964 the Reno Stead Airport was operated by the Ag Aviation Academy, which was then based in Minden Nevada, South of Reno. By 1966, the AG Aviation Academy moved totally up to Stead. In 1967 Robert E. Schricker retired from a 27-year career as a fighter pilot for the USAF and became Chief Pilot for the AG Academy. The academy taught all types of flying courses and ground schools, including helicopter and multi engine courses. Actress and race pilot, Susan Oliver, got her multi engine pilot license there in 1968. Chief Pilot Schricker left the AG Academy in 1969 to open his own flight school, Reno's Executive Air, at the main Reno Airport. In the 1960s Bill Lear, Lear Aviation, founder of the Lear Jet, also set up operations at the Stead Airport. Since 1964, it has been home to the National Championship Air Races, also known as the Reno Air Races, held every September.  2023 will be the final year for this event, since the Airport Authority prefers to appease developers and rich homeowners who chose to buy near an airport.  It was the launch site of "Earthwinds" balloon system in the early 1990s, which attempted and failed multiple times to circumnavigate the globe.

Facilities and aircraft 
Reno/Stead Airport covers an area of 5,000 acres (2,023 ha) at an elevation of 5,050 feet (1,539 m) above mean sea level. It has two runways with asphalt surfaces: 14/32 is 9,000 by 150 feet (2,743 x 46 m) and 8/26 is 7,608 by 150 feet (2,319 x 46 m).

For the 12-month period ending November 1, 2011, the airport had 71,000 aircraft operations, an average of 194 per day: 86% general aviation and 14% military.
At that time there were 114 aircraft based at this airport: 75% single-engine, 11% military, 6% multi-engine, 6% jet, 1% glider, and 1% ultralight.

See also 
 Reno-Tahoe International Airport (RNO)
 List of airports in Nevada
 Reno Air Races
2011 Reno Air Races crash

References

External links 
 Reno-Stead Airport page at Reno/Tahoe International Airport web site
 Reno Air Racing Association
  from Nevada DOT
 Aerial image as of September 1999 from USGS The National Map
 

Airports in Nevada
Transportation in Reno, Nevada
Buildings and structures in Reno, Nevada
1942 establishments in Nevada
Airports established in 1942